Major Francis Peirson (January 1757 – 6 January 1781) was a British Army officer who was serving on Jersey, in the Channel Islands off the coast of France. He was killed in the Battle of Jersey, one of the last battles to take place in the British Islands.

Early career 
Educated at Warrington Academy, Peirson joined the British Army in 1772. In 1779 he was appointed to the 95th Regiment of Foot, a fencible regiment raised for the defence of the British isles from invasion and was deployed with the regiment to Jersey the following year.

Battle of Jersey and death 

Following the capture and imprisonment of Major Moses Corbet, Commander of the Jersey Garrison, by French troops on 6 January 1781, Peirson refused French demands to surrender and took command of the Garrison. Peirson's refusal to surrender was contrary to the order of the imprisoned Corbet who had already signed the garrison's official capitulation under the threat that St Helier, island's town, would be burnt to the ground. Peirson energetically rallied the garrison from its various posts on the island, first dispatching Captain Hugh Fraser, commander of the Highlanders and light company, to secure the heights overlooking the town, which the French had inexplicably left unoccupied. Peirson then organised a counterattack against the main French force occupying St Helier, planning to outflank the De Rullecourt's troops by attacking the town from two directions. Many of the British soldiers were veterans of fighting in North America and the outnumbered French were driven back to the centre of the town at bayonet point. The ensuing exchange of fire felled the two opposing commanders. Peirson was shot in the heart by a musket ball whilst leading a flanking manoeuvre around the French position, De Rullecourt the French commander was killed whilst attempting to organise a last stand around the Statue of King George II. After Peirson's death, the troops he had commanded were victorious.
 The defeated French force fled from the town and dispersed into the countryside, where most were eventually captured. As the engagement in St Helier was being fought, Grenadiers from the 83rd Regiment under the command of Captain Campbell stormed and recaptured the La Platte Rocque Battery which had been occupied by 100 French troops.

Places named after Peirson
 The Peirson pub is where Philippe de Rullecourt, the opposing French General, died.
Peirson Place is the short street leading into the Royal Square where Peirson was shot
Peirson Road is another street in Saint Helier

References

1757 births
1781 deaths
British military personnel killed in the American Revolutionary War
Governors of Jersey
Sherwood Foresters officers
Military personnel from London
British Army personnel of the American Revolutionary War